Awlad Muhammad (or Ouled Muhammed) was a tribe that ruled over the Fezzan region from 1550 to 1812. At their height, their domain extended from Sokna in the north to Murzuq in the south and north niger and south east algeria .

Starting in 1577, the sultanate had to fend off against various attacks by the Ottoman and the Karamanli dynasty which often resulted in the looting, capture or vassilization of Fezzan. Some of these campaigns were conducted in 1581-1600, 1679-1682, 1690, 1716, 1718 and 1811/1812.

See also
Banu Khattab
Kanem–Bornu Empire
Ottoman Tripolitania

References 

Tribes of Africa